Gisela was a Unrochinger noblewoman and the mother of Regelinda of Zürich, Duchess of Swabia.

Her father was Liuto (Liutold) von Rheinau, attested as bailiff of the Rheinau monastery in 878, a son of Count Liutold, who married Judith "von Balingen". Judith was the daughter of Eberhard of Friuli and Gisela, daughter of Louis the Pious and Judith of Bavaria. She was thus a descendant of Charlemagne. 

Other sources state that Gisela's father was in fact Unruoch III of Friuli, a Unruoching, himself of Carolingian descent.

References

9th-century German women
10th-century German women
9th-century births
10th-century deaths
865 births
911 deaths
Carolingian dynasty